William Paxton is a computer scientist at the University of California, Santa Barbara. He is one of the founders of Adobe Systems and became one of the original designers and implementors of the PostScript page description language.

In 2021, Paxton was awarded the Beatrice M. Tinsley Prize for developing the MESA software for computational stellar astrophysics.

Stanford
Paxton received his PhD from Stanford in 1977. He worked with Doug Engelbart at the Stanford Research Institute where the group would build the Online System (NLS) and was there during "The Mother of All Demos".

Xerox PARC
After leaving Stanford, Paxton would join the Xerox Palo Alto Research Center (PARC) where they were working on emerging technologies, including Ethernet, networked personal computers, bitmap displays, graphical user-interfaces, and laser printers.

Adobe
Paxton joined Adobe in 1983. He built the Type 1 font algorithms for PDF. Paxton and his team  received the ACM Software System Award in 1989 for the design of the PostScript language and implementation.

Kavli Institute for Theoretical Physics
In 1990 Paxton retired from Adobe Systems and became an unofficial scholar in residence at the Kavli Institute for Theoretical Physics (KITP) at the University of California, Santa Barbara, where he started working on the physics of stellar evolution. He is responsible for the EZ stellar evolution program and has worked on the redesign of the Modules for Experiments in Stellar Astrophysics (MESA) system.

References

Living people
Adobe Inc. people
University of California faculty
Computer scientists
Year of birth missing (living people)